Niki Tippins (born 15 May 1976) is a retired New Zealand female tennis player.

On 15 May 2000, Tippins reached her best singles ranking of world number 457. On 23 August 1999, she peaked at world number 413 in the doubles rankings. Tippins retired from tennis 2005.

Playing for New Zealand Fed Cup team at the Fed Cup, Tippins has a win–loss record of 5–2.

Fed Cup participation

Singles

Doubles

References

External links 
 
 

1976 births
Living people
New Zealand female tennis players
21st-century New Zealand women